Legislative elections were held in South Korea on 13 April 2000.

Opinion polls suggested that the ruling Democratic Party would win the most seats, but the result was a victory for the conservative Grand National Party (GNP), which won 133 of the 299 seats in the National Assembly. The United Liberal Democrats (ULD) lost two-thirds of their seats due to GNP's victory in Gyeongsangbuk-do, Gangwon-do (South Korea), and also fewer local votes in Chungcheong.

With no party winning a majority, the 16th parliament was the first hung parliament in South Korean history.

The Democrats, ULD and Democratic People's Party (DPP) formed a coalition to gain a majority. However, the ULD withdrew support in 2001 and joined the conservative opposition. Seven ULD members subsequently defected from the party and joined the GNP, giving it a majority.

Political parties

Results

By city/province

Notes

References

External links
Republic of Korea: Election for Kukhoe (South Korean National Assembly) IFES]

Legislative elections in South Korea
South Korea
Legislative election
Legislative